The Marzilibahn, officially the Drahtseilbahn Marzili–Stadt Bern (Funicular Marzili–City of Bern) is a very short funicular in Bern, the capital of Switzerland. Its 105 meters of track lead from the Marzili neighbourhood to the Bundeshaus, the seat of the Swiss federal government and parliament, in the Old City of Bern.

History
The Marzilibahn was proposed by a committee of seven Bernese entrepreneurs, who received an 80-year operating license by the Swiss Federal Assembly on 13 December 1884. Construction began in March 1885 and was hastily completed to allow a start of operations on 19 July 1885, to coincide with the opening of the Eidgenössisches Schützenfest, the Swiss marksmen's festival, in Bern.

This car, being heavier, then pulled the other one up the slope, after which the water would be drained and the process repeated with the other car. Up to thirty persons could be transported upwards in this manner. The descent was controlled by an operator on the forward platform on the upper car, who communicated with his colleague in the lower car by means of bell signals.

The original green cars, built by the local machine company Pümpin & Herzog (later part of Von Roll) were replaced in 1914 by a new set of cars on account of the Swiss national exhibition in Bern, and the official name of the funicular was changed from Drahtseilbahn Aarziele to Drahtseilbahn Marzili-Stadt Bern. Ticket prices ranged from 10 rappen at the time of the opening (the Federal Council had to forbid charging non-locals twice that much) to 30 rappen in 1973. The area around and below the raised steel tracks was a garden, cared for by the conductors.

In 1974, the line was converted to electric power, and a third generation of cars supplied. The two second generation cars are both preserved, one at the Swiss Museum of Transport in Lucerne and the other close to the lower station of the line.

Technical parameters
The funicular has the following parameters:

Records
The Marzilibahn is sometimes called the shortest funicular in Europe, but its operators are not certain about this, noting that similarly short funiculars exist in England and Hungary. The Zagreb Funicular in Croatia is at any rate shorter at 66 m.

Operator
The Marzilibahn is owned and operated by a private company, Drahtseilbahn Marzili-Stadt Bern AG, which employs ten part-time staff. Its shares are held mostly by railway enthusiasts. In 2009, the company turned a profit of 175,000 Swiss francs.

See also 
 List of funicular railways
 List of funiculars in Switzerland

References

Bibliography

External links
 
 Official web site of the Marzilibahn

Funicular railways in Switzerland
Transport in Bern
Former water-powered funicular railways converted to electricity
750 mm gauge railways in Switzerland
Railway lines opened in 1885